3rd Battalion 12th Marines (3/12) is an artillery battalion comprising four firing batteries and a Headquarters Battery.   The firing batteries are not permanently assigned to the battalion- they are all on 6 month rotations in Okinawa from the 10th Marine Regiment and the 11th Marine Regiment (known as the Unit Deployment Program (UDP)).  The battalion is stationed at Camp Hansen, Okinawa, Japan, and its primary weapon systems are the M777 lightweight howitzer with a maximum effective range of 30 km, along with the M142 High Mobility Artillery Rocket System (HIMARS). The battalion utilizes the Unit Deployment Program to fill its four firing batteries with detachments from artillery units across the Marine Corps.

Mission
Provide direct support of the 3rd Marine Division in time of conflict. That support may come in the traditional fashion of artillery support to maneuver forces, or by providing batteries to serve as provisional rifle companies.  They also have the secondary mission of being the primary providers of  civil-military operations (CMO).  CMO is defined as the activities of the commander that establish, maintain, influence, or exploit relations between military organizations, Government and civilian organizations and the civilian populace.

Current units
 Headquarters Battery
 Four firing batteries rotating on unit deployment program (UDP) assignments from the 10th Marines and the 11th Marines.

History

World War II
3rd Battalion 12th Marines was activated on September 16, 1942, at Camp Elliott, California, as part of the 3rd Marine Division.

Deployed during January - February 1943 to Auckland, New Zealand

Participated in the following World War II Campaigns
Bougainville
Northern Solomons
Guam
Iwo Jima

Deactivated 28 December 1945

Reactivation and the Vietnam War

Reactivated 7 January 1952 at Camp Pendleton, California, as the 3rd Marine Division

Redeployed during August 1953 to Camp Gifu, Japan

Redeployed during February 1956 to Camp Courtney, Okinawa

Redeployed during April - May 1965 to the Republic of Vietnam

Participated in the war in Vietnam, April 1965 - November 1969, operating from
Quang Tri Province
Quang Nam Province
Thua Thien Province

Redeployed during November 1969 to Camp Courtney, Okinawa

Elements participated in evacuation operations in Vietnam and Cambodia, March - May 1975

India Btry 3/12 deployed and placed in reserve during the Mayaguez Incident May '75

1970s - 1990s

Elements participated in Operations Desert Shield and Desert Storm, Southwest Asia, 1990–1991

Elements participated in Operations Sea Angel, Bangladesh, May - June 1991

Elements Participated in Operation Fiery Vigil, Republic of the Philippines, June - July 1991

War on Terror

Elements participated in Operation Enduring Freedom, Afghanistan and Philippines, 2001 into 2009

Elements participated in Operation Iraqi Freedom, Iraq, 2003 into 2007

Elements participated in Operation Unified Assistance, Southeast Asia, December 2004 - February 2005

Elements participated in humanitarian relief efforts, Philippines, February - March 2006

Elements participated in Operation Enduring Freedom, Afghanistan, 2010

See also

List of United States Marine Corps battalions
Organization of the United States Marine Corps

Notes

References

Web

 Official Website 
 3rd Battalion, 12th Marines on GlobalSecurity.org

Artillery battalions of the United States Marine Corps